This is a list of the Estonia national under-21 football team results from 2014 to the present day.

Results

2014

2015

2016

2017

2018

2019

2020

References

External links
All matches of the Estonia national under-21 football team

Results U21
football results